The 1939 All-Eastern football team consists of American football players chosen by various selectors as the best players at each position among the Eastern colleges and universities during the 1939 college football season.

All-Eastern selections

Backs
 Edward Boell, NYU (AP-1)
 Ronnie Cahill, Holy Cross (AP-1)
 Bill Hutchinson, Dartmouth (AP-1)
 Dom Principe, Fordham (AP-1)

Ends
 Harlan Gustafson, Penn (AP-1)
 Alva Kelley, Cornell (AP-1)

Tackles
 Nick Drahos, Cornell (AP-1)
 Tarry Stella, Army (AP-1)

Guards
 Agostino Lio, Georgetown (AP-1)
 Ernest Schwotzer, Boston College (AP-1)

Centers
 Frank Finneran, Cornell (AP-1)

Key
 AP = Associated Press

See also
 1939 College Football All-America Team

References

All-Eastern
All-Eastern college football teams